Kamil Mrůzek (born 11 August 1977) is a Czech male canoeist who won several medals at senior level at the Wildwater Canoeing World Championships.

Biography
Mrůzek won three editions of the Wildwater Canoeing World Cup in K1, and he won 28 medals at World and European championships.

Kamil Mrůzek and the other legend of the Czech canoe Michaela Strnadová-Mrůzková are siblings-in-law, in that she married his brother.

Achievements

References

External links
 

1977 births
Living people
Czech male canoeists
Place of birth missing (living people)